Lynn Rogoff is an American film and television producer, playwright, screenwriter, theatre director, and academic. She is best known for writing the 1979 Emmy Award winning documentary film No Maps on My Taps and the 1983 play Love, Ben Love, Emma; the latter of which examines the correspondence between Emma Goldman and Ben Reitman. She is an associate professor at the New York Institute of Technology.

Early life and education
Born in New York City, Rogoff is the daughter of the veterinarian, George Rogoff, past President of the Bronx Veterinary Society and founder of the Veterinary Medical Association of New York City Journal. She is a graduate of New York University Tisch School of the Arts with an MFA in Directing. In 1979 she was one of eight individuals accepted into the Astoria Motion Picture and Television Center Foundation's internship program. In 1980 she became a fellow in the Writers Guild of America, East's Screen and Television Writing Fellowship program which was funded by the National Endowment for the Arts.

Career
Rogoff was nominated by the Writers Guild of America for writing the 1979 documentary film No Maps on My Taps. No Maps on My Taps was produced on grants from the AFI, PBS, the CPB, the Ford Foundation and the NEA. The film focuses on three black tap dancers who had fallen on hard times but had started dancing again.  No Maps on My Taps won an Emmy Award for Outstanding Musical Direction in News and Documentary. In 2017 the film was restored and featured at Tap City, the American Tap Dance Foundation's annual festival.

Rogoff assisted producer Rupert Hitzig on the film Wolfen (1981). In 1983 she was selected to be the United States' representative to the United Nations's women's series project. This included a conference held jointly between the U.N. and the New York chapter of the American Association of Women in Radio and Television.

Rogoff penned the play Love, Ben Love, Emma which is based on correspondence between Emma Goldman and Ben Reitman. The play was originally produced by Lucille Lortel at the White Barn Theatre in Westport, Connecticut in 1983, starring Kevin O'Connor, Penelope Allen, and Martha Greenhouse. In 2020, Love, Ben Love, Emma had its Chicago premiere, produced by the Wayward Sister's Theatre Company.

Rogoff's television work includes Sesame Street, and Big Blue Marble. She wrote Freedom Fighters: Freedom and Justice for African Americans.

In 2019, Rogoff's company wrote and produced Bird Woman, a magical realism audio drama series on the Native American life of Sacajawea of the Lewis and Clark Expedition. Sera-Lys McArthur voices Sacajawea. Daniel TwoFeathers voices Chief Cameahwait.

As a stage director, she has directed The Labyrinth by Fernando Arrabal (1973, NYU), A Streetcar Named Desire by Tennessee Williams (1974, The Atlas Room at NYU), Attempted Rescue On Avenue B by Megan Terry (1975, Cubiculo Theatre), and The In-Crowd, a rock opera by J. E. Franklin (1977, Henry Street Settlement).

Rogoff penned the narrative for the multimedia game Pony Express Rider; a product which was showcased at the Electric Entertainment Expo (E3) in 1996. That same year she advocated for writing for interactive media at the 1996 Show Biz Expo on behalf of the Writers Guild of America.

Rogoff serves as an associate professor at the New York Institute of Technology (NYIT) where she received the Presidential Excellence Award in New York City. In 2013, she received a research award from the NYIT to develop her GreenKids Media Endanger series at the university.

References

External links
Lynn Rogoff at IMDB

Living people
Year of birth missing (living people)
American dramatists and playwrights
American film producers
American theatre managers and producers
American television producers
American women television producers
Tisch School of the Arts alumni
New York Institute of Technology faculty